The New York Mets are a Major League Baseball franchise based in New York City. They play in the National League East division. Since the institution of Major League Baseball's Rule 4 Draft, the Mets have selected 63 players in its first round. Officially known as the "First-Year Player Draft", the Rule 4 Draft is Major League Baseball's primary mechanism for assigning amateur baseball players from high schools, colleges, and other amateur baseball clubs to its teams. The draft order is determined based on the previous season's standings, and the team that had the worst record receives the first pick. In addition, teams that lost free agents in the previous off-season may be awarded compensatory or supplementary picks. The First-Year Player Draft is unrelated to the 1961 expansion draft in which the Mets initially filled their roster.

Of the 63 players picked in the first round by the Mets, 25 have been pitchers, the most of any position; 18 of these were right-handed, while seven were left-handed. 18 of the players picked in the initial round were outfielders, while eight shortstops, six catchers, and three third basemen were selected. The team also selected two players at first base and one at second base. 14 of the players came from high schools or universities in the state of California, while Florida and Texas follow, with nine and five players, respectively.

Four Mets' first-round picks have won championships with the franchise. No first-round picks were on the 1969 championship team. Outfielders Lee Mazzilli (1973) and Darryl Strawberry (1980), shortstop Wally Backman (1977), and pitcher Dwight Gooden (1982) played in the 1986 World Series for the Mets' second championship team. Three first-round draft picks have gone on to win the Rookie of the Year Award with the Mets: Jon Matlack in 1972, Strawberry in 1983, and Gooden in 1984. Gooden went on to win the Cy Young Award in 1985, his second season, after placing second in the voting his rookie year. Gooden is also the only first-round draft pick of the Mets to make the All-Star team in his rookie season.

The Mets have made 11 selections in the supplemental round of the draft. They have also made the first overall selection five times (1966, 1968, 1980, 1984, and 1994), tied for the most such picks with the San Diego Padres. The first of these picks, Steve Chilcott (1966), is one of only two first overall picks (along with Brien Taylor) to never play in the major leagues. The Mets have had 18 compensatory picks since the institution of the First-Year Player Draft in 1965. These additional picks are provided when a team loses a particularly valuable free agent in the prior off-season, or, more recently, if a team fails to sign a draft pick from the previous year. One player, George Ambrow (1970), did not sign with the Mets after he was drafted but they received no compensation pick.

Key

Picks

See also
New York Mets minor league players

Footnotes
Free agents are evaluated by the Elias Sports Bureau and rated "Type A", "Type B", or not compensation eligible. If a team offers arbitration to a player but that player refuses and subsequently signs with another team, the original team may receive additional draft picks. If a "Type A" free agent leaves in this way his previous team receives a supplemental pick and a compensation pick from the team with which he signs. If a "Type B" free agent leaves in this way his previous team receives only a supplemental pick.
 The Mets gained a compensatory first-round pick in 1980 from the Pittsburgh Pirates for losing free agent Andy Hassler.
 The Mets gained a compensatory first-round pick in 1980 from the Boston Red Sox for losing free agent Skip Lockwood.
 The Mets gained a compensatory first-round pick in 1983 from the Atlanta Braves for losing free agent Pete Falcone.
 The Mets gained a supplemental first-round pick in 1983 for losing free agent Pete Falcone.
 The Mets gained a compensatory first-round pick in 1991 from the Los Angeles Dodgers for losing free agent Darryl Strawberry.
 The Mets gained a supplemental first-round pick in 1991 for losing free agent Darryl Strawberry.
 The Mets gained a compensatory first-round pick in 1992 from the Boston Red Sox for losing free agent Frank Viola.
 The Mets gained a supplemental first-round pick in 1992 for losing free agent Frank Viola.
 The Mets gained a compensatory first-round pick in 1994 from the Baltimore Orioles for losing free agent Sid Fernandez.
 The Mets gained a supplemental first-round pick in 1994 for losing free agent Sid Fernandez.
 The Mets lost their first-round pick in 1999 to the Chicago White Sox as compensation for signing free agent Robin Ventura.
 The Mets gained a compensatory first-round pick in 2000 from the Seattle Mariners for losing free agent John Olerud.
 The Mets gained a supplemental first-round pick in 2000 for losing free agent John Olerud.
 The Mets gained a compensatory first-round pick in 2001 from the Colorado Rockies for losing free agent Mike Hampton.
 The Mets gained a supplemental first-round pick in 2001 for losing free agent Mike Hampton.
 The Mets lost their first-round pick in 2006 to the Philadelphia Phillies as compensation for signing free agent Billy Wagner.
 The Mets lost their original first-round pick in 2007 to the San Francisco Giants as compensation for signing free agent Moisés Alou but gained a supplemental first-round pick for losing free agent Roberto Hernández.
 The Mets gained a supplemental first-round pick in 2007 for losing free agent Chad Bradford.
 The Mets gained a compensatory first-round pick in 2008 from the Atlanta Braves for losing free agent Tom Glavine.
 The Mets gained a supplemental first-round pick in 2008 for losing free agent Tom Glavine.
 The Mets lost their first-round pick in 2009 to the Los Angeles Angels as compensation for signing free agent Francisco Rodríguez.
 The Mets gained a supplemental first-round pick in 2011 for losing free agent Pedro Feliciano.
 The Mets gained a supplemental first-round pick in 2012 for losing free agent José Reyes.
 The Mets lost their first-round pick in 2015 to the Colorado Rockies as compensation for signing free agent Michael Cuddyer.
 The Mets gained a supplemental first-round pick in 2016 for losing free agent Daniel Murphy.

References
General references

In-text citations

First-round
New York Mets